The James Fennemore House, at 195 N. 2nd East in Beaver, Utah, was built in 1887.  It was listed on the National Register of Historic Places in 1983.

It is a one-and-a-half-story house with a mansard roof, which somewhat gives it a Second Empire appearance.

See also
Dr. George Fennemore House

References

		
National Register of Historic Places in Beaver County, Utah
Houses completed in 1887